The Kokomo Jackrabbits are a college summer baseball team based in Kokomo, Indiana. They are a member of the summer collegiate Northwoods League, beginning with the 2019 season. Previously, the team played in the Prospect League. The Jackrabbits play at the 4,000-seat Kokomo Municipal Stadium in downtown Kokomo.

Namesake 
Kokomo's baseball team went through a naming contest in the summer of 2014 before landing on the winning name of "Jackrabbits." Of around 1,000 entries in the online naming campaign, 15 people suggested the name "Jackrabbit" for Kokomo's Prospect League team. The name is the same as a popular automobile developed by the Apperson Brothers in a building adjacent to where Kokomo Municipal Stadium now stands.

Colors & uniform 
The Kokomo Jackrabbits have adopted a look that is reminiscent of the San Diego Padres uniforms during the 1970s and 1980s with brown, mustard and orange colors.

Seasons
The Jackrabbits have canceled their 2020 season due to the COVID-19 pandemic.

Coaches
On October 20, 2014, Greg Van Horn was named the first Field Manager in Jackrabbits history. After a tumultuous first thirty games to the 2015 season (in which he was ejected three times), Van Horn was relieved of his duties by Matt Howard, who remained in place for the 2016 season.

Howard lead the Jackrabbits to a 46–45 record across his one and a half seasons. Howard then moved on to accept the same position at Indiana University Kokomo, where he became the baseball team's first field manager in school history.

The Jackrabbits then hired former Austin Peay coach and all time Ohio Valley Conference wins leader Gary McClure. McClure posted a 64-55 (.538) record in his two seasons with the club. After leading the team to the Prospect League Championship Series in the 2018 season, it was announced that McClure would be taking over as the first manager of the American Association of Independent Professional Baseball expansion team, the Milwaukee Milkmen (also owned by the Jackrabbits' parent company, ROC Ventures).

In 2022 Johnston Hobbs was hired by Nathan Martin. Martin is the general manager and won general manager of the year for Northwoods League teams in Indiana. Good job Nate.

References 

Kokomo, Indiana
Amateur baseball teams in Indiana
Prospect League teams
2014 establishments in Indiana
Baseball teams established in 2014
Sports in Kokomo, Indiana